This article contains information about the literary events and publications of 1684.

Events
June 25 – The death of Robert Leighton, Archbishop of Glasgow, gives rise to establishment of the Leighton Library at Dunblane, the oldest surviving public subscription (lending) library in Scotland.
July 25 – The English novelist and dramatist Mary Griffith marries merchant George Pix.
November 11 – The English dramatist Nathaniel Lee is admitted to Bedlam Hospital for the insane.
unknown dates
The Protestant Academy of Saumur is closed down by King Louis XIV of France.
John Banks' historical play The Island Queens, or the Death of Mary Queen of Scotland is banned from the stage; it is produced as The Albion Queens twenty years later (1704).
Pierre Bayle begins his journal of literary criticism, Nouvelles de la république des lettres.

New books

Fiction
Aphra Behn – Love-Letters Between a Nobleman and His Sister
John Bunyan – The Pilgrim's Progress, Second Part
Giovanni Paolo Marana – Letters Writ by a Turkish Spy
Ihara Saikaku – The Great Mirror of Beauties

Drama
Jean de La Chapelle – Ajax
John Horne – Fortune's Task, or the Fickle Fair One
John Lacy – Sir Hercules Buffoon
Simon Neale – The Mistaken Beauty (adapted from Corneille)
John Wilmot, 2nd Earl of Rochester (possible author) – Sodom, or the Quintessence of Debauchery
Thomas Southerne – The Disappointment, or the Mother of Fashion
Pedro Calderon de la Barca
Los cabellos de Absalón
Guárdate del agua mansa

Poetry
Aphra Behn – Poems upon Several Occasions
Pavao Ritter Vitezović – Odiljenje sigetsko (Farewell at Sziget)

Non-fiction
Jakob Abbadie – Traité de la vérité de la religion chrétienne
Dorcas Dole – Once More a Warning to Thee, O England, but more particularly to the inhabitants of the city of Bristol (by a Quaker)
Edward Phillips – Enchiridion linguae latinae
Christian Knorr von Rosenroth – Kabbala Denudata (publication completed)
Christopher Sandius – Bibliotheca antitrinitariorum
George Savile, 1st Marquess of Halifax – The Character of a Trimmer
Antonio de Solís y Rivadeneyra – Historia de la conquista de México

Births
February 21 – Justus van Effen, Dutch journalist writing also in French (died 1735)
October 16 – Peter Walkden, English diarist (died 1769)
December 3 – Ludvig Holberg, Danish/Norwegian essayist, philosopher and playwright (died 1754)

Deaths
April 1 – Roger Williams, English-born American theologian (born 1603)
October 1 – Pierre Corneille, French dramatist (born 1606)
December 7 – John Oldham, English satirical poet and translator (born 1653)
Unknown date – Francisco de Avellaneda, Spanish dramatist and poet (born c. 1625)

References

 
Years of the 17th century in literature